Guang Ming Daily is a Chinese language newspaper published in Malaysia. Formerly known as Sin Pin Jit Poh or Sin Pin Daily, it was founded by Aw Boon Haw who also started the Sin Chew Daily. Sin Pin Daily was headquartered in Penang. It stopped publishing in 1986 after major changes in management.

The former staff of the Sin Pin Daily started the Guang Ming Daily in December 1987 with the help from Lim Keng Yaik.

In 1992, the Rimbunan Hijau Group bought over Guang Ming Daily and thus making it the sister company again with Sin Chew Daily.

External links 
Official site (Chinese)

1987 establishments in Malaysia
Chinese-language mass media in Malaysia
Newspapers published in Malaysia
Mass media in George Town, Penang
Aw family
Newspapers established in 1987